Zorigtbaataryn Enkhzorig (February 27, 1987 – November 4, 2018) was an amateur boxer from Mongolia who competed at the 2006 Asian Games in the Featherweight (-57 kg) division, beat Galib Jafarov and won the silver medal in a lost match against Uzbekistan's Bahodirjon Sultonov 15-37.

At the Olympics 2008 he beat Mahdi Ouatine 10:1 but was edged out 9:10 by Cuban Idel Torriente. At the World Championships in 2009 he lost to José Pedraza.

References

External links
 

1987 births
2018 deaths
Featherweight boxers
Boxers at the 2008 Summer Olympics
Olympic boxers of Mongolia
Asian Games medalists in boxing
Boxers at the 2006 Asian Games
Mongolian male boxers
Asian Games silver medalists for Mongolia
Medalists at the 2006 Asian Games
20th-century Mongolian people
21st-century Mongolian people